Hana Shezifi (also Channa or Hannah and Shezifi-Zadik or -Tsadik; חנה שזיפי; born November 5, 1943) is an Israeli former Olympic runner.

Shezifi is a former Israeli Women's Champion in the 400 metres, 800 metres, and 1500 metres, won a gold medal for Israel in the 800 metres at the 1966 Asian Games, and won gold medals for Israel in the 800 metres and the 1500 metres at the 1970 Asian Games.  She was voted the 1970 Outstanding Woman Athlete by the Asian Track and Field Federation, and was voted Israel's Athlete of the Year in 1970.

Early and personal life
Shezifi was born in Baghdad, Iraq, and is Jewish. She is married to Ilan Shezifi, chief tournament director for the Israel Bridge Federation, who is also a former runner.

Track career
Shezifi began running with Petach Tikva Hapoel when she was 16 years old. Her personal bests were 56.35 in the 400 metre run (1968), and 2:06.5 in the 800 metre run (1970).

She was the Israeli Women's Champion in the 400 metres (1967), in the 800 metres (1961–68, 1971), and in the 1500 metres (1970). Shezifi competed for Israel in the 1965 Maccabiah Games.

She won a gold medal for Israel at the 1966 Asian Games in the 800 metres in Thailand in 2:10.5.

Shezifi competed for Israel at the 1968 Summer Olympics in Mexico City, Mexico, at the age of 24, in track.  In the Women's 400 metres she came in 7th in Heat 3 with a time of 56.3, and in the Women's 800 metres she came in 6th in Heat 2 with a time of 2:09.23. When she competed in the Olympics she was 5–1.5 (157 cm) tall and weighed 108 lbs (49 kg).

She won gold medals for Israel at the 1970 Asian Games in the 800 metres (2:06.5; winning by 40 metres and setting an Israeli record) and the 1500 metres (4:25) in Thailand, and Shezifi was voted the Outstanding Woman Athlete by the Asian Track and Field Federation. Shezifi was voted Israel's Athlete of the Year in 1970.

She won a bronze medal for Israel in the 1500 metres (4:31) at the 1974 Asian Games in Tehran, Iran.

She also won bronze medals in the 1500 metres and the 3000 metres at the 1975 Asian Athletics Championships held in Seoul, South Korea.

Bridge career
Since 1996, Shezifi has been Chairperson of the Israeli Bridge Federation.

References 

Living people
Israeli female middle-distance runners
Athletes (track and field) at the 1966 Asian Games
Athletes (track and field) at the 1970 Asian Games
Athletes (track and field) at the 1974 Asian Games
Athletes (track and field) at the 1968 Summer Olympics
1943 births
Sportspeople from Baghdad
Competitors at the 1965 Maccabiah Games
Maccabiah Games competitors for Israel
Olympic athletes of Israel
Jewish female athletes (track and field)
Asian Games gold medalists for Israel
Asian Games bronze medalists for Israel
Medalists at the 1966 Asian Games
Medalists at the 1970 Asian Games
Medalists at the 1974 Asian Games
Asian Games medalists in athletics (track and field)
Israeli people of Iraqi-Jewish descent
Iraqi emigrants to Israel